Nikola Lazetić (born 9 February 1978) is a Serbian former footballer who played as a winger.

Club career
Born in Titova Mitrovica, Lazetić started out at his hometown club Trepča. He was later discovered by Tomislav Milićević who brought him to Red Star Belgrade. In December 1995, Lazetić made his league debut for the club in a 5–1 home win over Proleter Zrenjanin. He made three more appearances in the second half of the 1995–96 season. In the summer of 1996, Lazetić was loaned to Budućnost Valjevo, before returning to Red Star in the second part of the 1996–97 season. He also played on dual registration for Hajduk Beograd during the spring of 1997.

In the summer of 1998, Lazetić signed a contract with Vojvodina, helping them reach the 1998 UEFA Intertoto Cup final. He subsequently moved to Obilić in a controversial transfer during the winter of 1999, spending the next year and a half at the club. After his retirement, he confirmed that he had been brought to Obilić against his will.

In May 2000, Lazetić was sold to Turkish club Fenerbahçe for an undisclosed fee. He helped them win the league in his debut season, contributing with five goals in 30 appearances. In his second year, Lazetić appeared in 16 league games and scored once, as the team finished runners-up to Galatasaray.

In June 2002, Lazetić moved to Italy and joined Serie A newcomers Como. He was loaned to Chievo three months later, without making his debut for Como. In January 2003, Lazetić's rights were transferred to Lazio until the end of the season.

In July 2003, Lazetić joined fellow Serie A club Siena on a season-long loan from Como. He was subsequently sold to Serie B side Genoa, but remained on loan at Siena. In August 2005, Lazetić signed a two-year contact with Serie A club Livorno. He later moved to Serie B side Torino in January 2006, helping them win promotion to the top flight. Afterwards, Lazetić spent two more seasons at the club.

In August 2008, Lazetić returned to Serbia and joined his parent club Red Star Belgrade, signing a two-year contract. He captained the side that won the 2009–10 Serbian Cup. In June 2010, Lazetić left the club after failing to agree to a contract extension.

In August 2010, Lazetić signed a one-year deal with his former club Vojvodina. He helped the team reach the 2010–11 Serbian Cup final, before leaving at the end of his contract.

International career
At international level, Lazetić was capped 25 times and scored once for Serbia and Montenegro (formerly known as FR Yugoslavia) between 1998 and 2003.

Post-playing career
In June 2019, Lazetić was appointed as sporting director of Vojvodina.

Personal life
Lazetić is the older brother of fellow former footballer Žarko Lazetić. 

He appeared as the main protagonist in popular Serbian folk singer Svetlana Ceca Ražnatović's video 'Red' in which he portrayed a mobster.

Career statistics

Club

International

Honours

Club
Red Star Belgrade
 FR Yugoslavia Cup: 1996–97
 Serbian Cup: 2009–10
Fenerbahçe
 Süper Lig: 2000–01

Individual
 Serbian SuperLiga Team of the Season: 2009–10

Notes

References

External links
 
 
 
 
 

A.C. ChievoVerona players
A.C.N. Siena 1904 players
Association football midfielders
Como 1907 players
Expatriate footballers in Italy
Expatriate footballers in Turkey
Fenerbahçe S.K. footballers
First League of Serbia and Montenegro players
FK Budućnost Valjevo players
FK Hajduk Beograd players
FK Milicionar players
FK Obilić players
FK Vojvodina players
FK Železnik players
Genoa C.F.C. players
Kosovo Serbs
Red Star Belgrade footballers
Second League of Serbia and Montenegro players
Serbia and Montenegro expatriate footballers
Serbia and Montenegro expatriate sportspeople in Italy
Serbia and Montenegro expatriate sportspeople in Turkey
Serbia and Montenegro footballers
Serbia and Montenegro international footballers
Serbia and Montenegro under-21 international footballers
Serbian expatriate footballers
Serbian expatriate sportspeople in Italy
Serbian footballers
Serbian SuperLiga players
Serie A players
Serie B players
Sportspeople from Mitrovica, Kosovo
S.S. Lazio players
Süper Lig players
Torino F.C. players
U.S. Livorno 1915 players
1978 births
Living people